Third Stage is the third studio album by the American rock band Boston, released on September 26, 1986, on MCA Records. It was recorded at Boston co-founder Tom Scholz's Hideaway Studio over a long, strained, six-year period "between floods and power failures". Scholz and vocalist Brad Delp were the only original members. The lyrics invoke themes of aging and working through stages in life. The first track and lead single, "Amanda", became a number one hit and one of the group's best known songs. The album itself was eventually certified 4× platinum by the RIAA.

Development
After winning a legal battle with Epic Records, Scholz switched Boston to the MCA record label. The album's first track, "Amanda", had been written in 1980 (when Boston began work on the album) and became the band's only #1 single. It reached #1 for two weeks in November 1986. The second Top 10 single, "We're Ready", reached #9. The singles "Cool the Engines" and "Can'tcha Say (You Believe in Me)/Still in Love" also got substantial airplay, with the former reaching #4 on the Billboard Mainstream Rock chart, and the latter peaking at #20 on the Billboard Hot 100 in 1987. "Can'tcha Say" remains Boston's last Top 40 hit to date.

After only three weeks on the chart, Third Stage reached #1 on the Billboard 200 for four weeks. It is the first CD-formatted album to have been certified gold (500,000 copies) by the RIAA. It was also certified gold in the LP format, believed to be the first album certified in both of these formats. In all, the album was certified 4× platinum.

It is the first Boston LP with electronic drum samples, the first to include songs not written by either Scholz or Brad Delp, the first Boston LP without original members Barry Goudreau, Sib Hashian and Fran Sheehan (though Hashian played drums on four tracks and Sheehan was included in the early recording session and received a writing credit). Jim Masdea plays drums on most of the album. It is the first Boston recording to use the Rockman guitar processor, invented by Scholz. No orchestral sounds or synthesizers are on the album. Critics have noted that the album has a much darker, more somber tone than Boston's previous work.

Track listing

Personnel 
Adapted from Third Stage liner notes.

 Brad Delp – lead and harmony vocals
 Tom Scholz – grand piano, electric piano, Hammond organ, theater organ, lead guitar, rhythm guitar, acoustic guitar, bass guitar, some drums, guitar "violin", rocket ignition, thunderstorms, unidentified flying objects
 Gary Pihl – lead guitar (8)
 Jim Masdea – drums (5–10)
 Sib Hashian – drums (1–4)

Production 
 Tom Scholz – producer, arrangements, engineer, liner notes 
 Gragg Lumsford – piano track engineer (9) at Blue Jay Studios (Carlisle, Massachusetts)
 Augustine Antoine – technical support 
 Mike Blackmere – technical support 
 Bill Clack – technical support 
 Del Eilers – technical support 
 Neil Miller – technical support 
 Gary Pihl – technical support 
 Bob Ludwig – mastering at Masterdisk (New York, NY)
 John Salozzo – cover artwork 
 Chris Serra – cover concept sleeve drawing
 Richard Ocean – photography 
 Ron Pownall – photography

Charts

Certifications

See also
List of number-one albums of 1986 (U.S.)

References

1986 albums
Boston (band) albums
Concept albums
Albums produced by Tom Scholz
MCA Records albums